Frame of Mind is an American movie about the John F. Kennedy assassination. The film stars Carl T. Evans – who also directed the film – along with Chris Noth, Eric Michael Espiritu, and Tony Lo Bianco. Peter Criss, original drummer for the rock band Kiss, also appears in the movie.  The film tells the story of New Jersey Detective David Secca, who discovers what appears to be new evidence relating to President Kennedy's assassination. The premises for the fictional account (there is no online record of any real "Vincent Garbone" the alleged Mafia hitman in the story) are three frames of a homemade movie clip, a rifle that matches the one used by Lee Harvey Oswald, and a relationship between the Mafia and an aged employee of the NSA (to which the audience has privileged access). The lead cop spends the rest of the time gradually increasing the significance of the clip of a man hiding a rifle under his coat at Dealey Plaza to the point where he can convince Kennedy assassination expert and author played by Chris Noth that the images are relevant, as people start dying around them and the CIA and mob start responding to his interest.

References

External links

American films based on actual events
Films set in New Jersey
Films shot in New Jersey
2009 drama films